Filipe Gonçalo Pinto Martins (born 29 May 1978) is a Portuguese former footballer who played as a left back, and the current manager of Casa Pia.

Playing career
Born in Amadora, Martins began his senior career with hometown side C.F. Estrela da Amadora, appearing in three Primeira Liga matches with the first team. He left the club in January 1999 to join Segunda Divisão de Honra side G.D. Estoril Praia, where he also featured rarely as the club suffered relegation.

Martins went on to resume his career in the lower levels, representing Clube Oriental de Lisboa, C.S.D. Câmara de Lobos, Atlético Clube de Portugal (two stints) and Odivelas before returning to his first club Estrela in 2009. He retired in 2011 with C.A. Pêro Pinheiro, aged 33.

Coaching career
He led the side to a promotion to the second division in his first season, but resigned on 16 January 2018.

On 14 June 2018, Martins replaced Luís Freire at the helm of C.D. Mafra, also in division two. The following 4 February, he left the club to take over C.D. Feirense in the Primeira Liga, but was unable to avoid relegation.

Martins left Feirense on a mutual agreement on 11 November 2019, after three consecutive league defeats. The following 1 September, he was named manager of Casa Pia A.C., leading the side to a ninth position in the 2020–21 campaign.

In the 2021–22 season, Martins led Casa Pia to the a first top-flight promotion in 83 years as runners-up to Rio Ave F.C. in the second division, but was absent for one match in February 2022 due to consequences of the COVID-19 epidemic.

Managerial statistics

References

External links

1978 births
Living people
People from Amadora
Portuguese footballers
Association football defenders
Primeira Liga players
Liga Portugal 2 players
Segunda Divisão players
C.F. Estrela da Amadora players
G.D. Estoril Praia players
Clube Oriental de Lisboa players
Atlético Clube de Portugal players
Odivelas F.C. players
Portuguese football managers
Primeira Liga managers
Liga Portugal 2 managers
C.D. Feirense managers
Casa Pia A.C. managers
Sportspeople from Lisbon District